Tacy may refer to:

Tacy, West Virginia, an unincorporated community in Barbour County
Carl Tacy (1932–2020), an American former college basketball coach